Ahmed Kelly (born 18 November 1991) is an Iraqi-born Australian Paralympic swimmer. At the 2020 Tokyo Paralympics, his third games, he won the silver medal in the Men's 150 m individual medley SM3 .

Personal

Nicknamed "Liquid Nails", Kelly was born on 18 November 1991 in Baghdad, Iraq with a double arm and leg deficiency.  Until the age of seven, he lived in at Baghdad's Mother Teresa Orphanage with his brother, Emmanuel who has a similar disability. Moira Kelly, on her own, met the brothers in 1998 and with her parents' help, brought them to Victoria, Australia in 2000 to get medical care for their disability. Kelly's treatment involved having parts of his legs removed that were deficient, and then being fitted with prosthesis. Moira adopted the brothers in 2000. In 2009, he became an Australian citizen. Ahmed attended secondary school at Assumption College Kilmore, in Kilmore, Victoria from year levels 7 to 10 and Carey Grammar for levels 11 & 12. His primary school was St.Patrick's Primary School Kilmore, in Kilmore, Victoria also. He was featured on the ABC's "Race to London".
In 2013 he commenced university studying a Bachelor of Arts at La Trobe University in Melbourne and dreams of working in the media as a sports commentator in the future.

His brother has appeared on Australia's X-Factor. He has Bangladeshi-born twin sisters who were conjoined at birth. They attend his swimming meets to cheer for Kelly.

Kelly played Australian rules football for a team in Kilmore, Victoria. When playing, he did not wear prosthetic arms. He played Australian Rules for his school's Year 7/8 team.

Swimming
Kelly is an S4, SB3 (breaststroke), SM4 (individual medley) classified swimmer and swims for  Melbourne Vicentre Swimming Club. He was coached by Brad Harris but in 2021 trains at the Australian Institute of Sport in Canberra under coach Yuriy Vdovychenko .
, he has a scholarship with the Victorian Institute of Sport.

He started swimming in 2008, after making a switch from Australian rules football.

Kelly first represented Australia in 2009 at the Darwin, Northern Territory hosted  Oceania Paralympic Championships.

In 2009, he competed in the Arafura Games. He competed in the 2010 Australian National Championships, finishing first in the 100 metre breaststroke event in world record time.

He repeated this feat in 2011 where he again set a world record. He represented  Australia at the 2012 Summer Paralympics in four events.  His best result was fourth in the Men's 50m Breaststroke SB3.

At the 2015 IPC Swimming World Championships in Glasgow, he competed in five events – Men's 50m Freestyle S4, Men's 150m Individual Medley SM4, Men's 50m Backstroke, Men's 50m Breaststroke SB3 and Men's 4 x 50m Freestyle Relay 20 Points. His best result was sixth in the Men's 50m Breaststroke SB3.

Kelly competed in four events at the 2016 Rio Paralympic Games. He placed seventh in Men's 50m Breaststroke SB3 and sixth in Mixed 4 x 50m Freestyle Relay (20 points). He also competed in Men's 50m Backstroke S3 and Men's 150m Individual Medley SM4 but didn't progress to the finals.

At the 2019 World Para Swimming Championships, London, Kelly won the silver medal in the Men's 150m Individual Medley SM3.

Kelly won his first Paralympic medal at the 2020 Tokyo Paralympics, by winning the silver medal in the Men's 150 m individual medley SM3 with a time of 3:02.23, just over 5 seconds slower than the gold medal winner Jesús Hernández Hernández of Mexico He competed in the Men's 50 m breaststroke SB3 final and finished seventh.

References

External links
 
 
 
 

Living people
1991 births
Male Paralympic swimmers of Australia
Swimmers at the 2012 Summer Paralympics
Swimmers at the 2016 Summer Paralympics
Paralympic silver medalists for Australia
Swimmers at the 2020 Summer Paralympics
Medalists at the 2020 Summer Paralympics
Paralympic medalists in swimming
Australian male breaststroke swimmers
Sportspeople from Baghdad
Victorian Institute of Sport alumni
World record holders in paralympic swimming
Australian adoptees
Iraqi emigrants to Australia
S4-classified Paralympic swimmers
People educated at Carey Baptist Grammar School
Medalists at the World Para Swimming Championships
Australian male medley swimmers
Naturalised citizens of Australia